The EuroDeaf 2019, short for the 2019 European Deaf Football Championships, is the ninth edition of the European competition of deaf football national teams for men. It was organized by the European Deaf Sport Organization (EDSO), and was held in Heraklion, Greece between 2 and 15 June 2019. 16 men's national teams competed first in the group stage and subsequently in knock-out stage. Ukraine won the title for the first time, defeating Germany in the final, Greece placed third before Ireland.

Venues
Four stadiums, Archanes Stadium, Irodotos Stadium, Pankritio Stadium and Theodoros Vardinogiannis Stadium, hosted the games.

Participating nations

Group stage

Pool A

Pool B

Pool C

Pool D

Knockout stage

Elimination
<onlyinclude>

Classification

Rankings

Awards

References

2019
International association football competitions hosted by Greece
2019 in disability sport
2019 in association football
June 2019 sports events in Europe
2019–20 in Greek football
2019–20 in European football
2019